Four ships in the United States Navy have been named USS Gwin for William Gwin.

  was a torpedo boat, commissioned in 1898 and decommissioned in 1914. She was renamed Cyane and reclassified YFB-4 in 1920, and finally sold in 1925
  was a  commissioned in 1920, and decommissioned in 1922.
  was a  destroyer-minelayer, commissioned in 1944 and decommissioned in 1958. She was transferred to Turkey in 1971 and renamed TCG Muavenet (DM-357). She was scrapped in 1992.

United States Navy ship names